Chronicle Mysteries is a 2019 American/Canadian mystery film series that stars Alison Sweeney as Alex McPherson, a podcast host, and Benjamin Ayres as Drew Godfrey, the editor of a local newspaper. Set in the small Pennsylvania town of Harrington, it airs on Hallmark Movies & Mysteries in the United States.

Main cast
Alison Sweeney as Alexandra "Alex" McPherson, a podcast host who moves to her hometown and stays to manage the local newspaper, The Chronicle which is owned by her uncle
Benjamin Ayres as Andrew "Drew" Godfrey, a single father who works as the editor-in-chief at The Chronicle newspaper
Michael Kopsa as Miles Lewiston, the publisher and owner of The Chronicle and Alex's uncle
Rebecca Staab as Eileen Bruce, a lifestyle journalist at the newspaper
Olivia Steele Falconer as Kendall Godfrey, Drew's teenage daughter who interns with the newspaper
Dave Collette as Charlie "Chuck" Matthews, press manager at the newspaper
Toby Levins as Sean Mullen, a local fireman who becomes interested in Alex

Characters

 A dark grey cell indicates the character was not in the film.

Films

Production and filming
The first three films were shot in Vancouver, Canada.

References

External links

American film series
American mystery films
American television films
Canadian mystery films
Canadian television films
Hallmark Channel original programming
Hallmark Channel original films
Films directed by Jason Bourque